Schakels ("Connections") is a 1920 Dutch silent film directed by Maurits Binger and based on a play by Dutch playwright Herman Heijermans. The original movie and all copies are lost.

Cast
 Jan van Dommelen - Pancras Duif
 Adelqui Migliar - Henk Duif
 Annie Bos - Marianne
 Paula de Waart - Pancras' wife
 Frits Bouwmeester - Toontje
 Jeanne Van der Pers - Toontje's girlfriend
 Louis Davids - estate agent Jan Duif
 Henny Van Merle - Jan Duif's wife
 Coen Hissink
 Renee Spiljar - Marianne's son
 Alex Benno - Ragman
 Yard Van Staalduynen - Psychiatrist

External links 
 

1920 films
Dutch silent feature films
Dutch black-and-white films
Lost Dutch films
Films directed by Maurits Binger